Penukonda Junction (station code: PKD) is the primary railway station serving Penukonda in Andhra Pradesh, India. The station comes under the jurisdiction of Bangalore railway division of South Western Railways. The station has two platforms. The station is situated at junction of three lines branching towards Dharmavaram,  and Yesvantpur.

References

Bangalore railway division
Railway junction stations in Andhra Pradesh
Railway stations in Anantapur district